Cerezo Osaka Under−23 was a Japanese football team based in Osaka. It was the reserve team of Cerezo Osaka and played in J3 League which they have done since their entry to the league at the beginning of the 2016 season. They played the majority of their home games at Kincho Stadium.

History
Cerezo Osaka joined J3 League in 2016 along with the reserve teams of neighbours Gamba Osaka and FC Tokyo. None of these clubs are eligible for promotion to J2 League additionally they can only field 3 players over the age of 23.

Record as J.League member
{|class="wikitable" style="text-align:center"
|-bgcolor="#efefef"
! Season !! Div. !! Teams !! Pos. !!GP !!W !!D !!L !!F !!A !!GD !!Pts !!Attendance/G !!Top scorer
|-
|2016
|bgcolor=#FFC655 rowspan="5"|J3
|16 ||12th ||30 ||8 ||8 ||14 ||38 ||47 ||-9 ||32 ||1,488 ||Rei Yonezawa 8
|-
|2017
|17 ||13th ||32 ||8 ||11 ||13 ||39 ||43 ||-4 ||35 ||909 ||Takeru Kishimoto 9
|-
|2018
|17 ||7th ||32 ||13 ||7 ||12 ||47 ||36 ||11 ||46 ||1,112 ||Rei Yonezawa 12
|-
|2019
|18 ||6th ||34 ||16 ||4 ||14 ||49 ||56 ||-7 ||52 ||1,196 ||Mizuki Ando 11
|-
|2020 †
|18 ||18th ||34 ||5 ||10 ||19 ||28 ||61 ||-33 ||25 ||559 ||Shota Fujio 8
|}
Key

Current squad
As of 6 September 2020.

References

External links
Cerezo Osaka

Cerezo Osaka U-23
Football clubs in Osaka
J.League clubs
Association football clubs established in 2016
2016 establishments in Japan
Defunct football clubs in Japan
Association football clubs disestablished in 2020
2020 disestablishments in Japan